Masaryk is a Czech surname. 

Masaryk may also refer to:
 1841 Masaryk, an outer main-belt asteroid
 A Prominent Patient, a 2017 Czech film, known as Masaryk
 Avenida Presidente Masaryk, an important avenue in Mexico City
 Kfar Masaryk (village of Masaryk), a kibbutz in northern Israel
 Masaryk Circuit, a Czech racing circuit
 Masaryk University, the second largest university in the Czech Republic

See also